"Whatever" is a song recorded by American country music group The Statler Brothers.  It was released in July 1982 as the first single from the album The Legend Goes On.  The song reached #7 on the Billboard Hot Country Singles & Tracks chart.  The song was written by Don Reid and Harold Reid. It is considered to be one of the rarest hits in the Statlers' catalog, as the Legend Goes On album has never been issued on CD as of 2017, and the song had never appeared on any of the group's compilation albums until 2010 when it was included on the 2-disc edition of their ICON Series release.

Music video
"Whatever" was the group's first music video. However, original tenor Lew DeWitt, who performed on the track, had fallen ill and could not appear in it. His eventual replacement, Jimmy Fortune, substituted for him in the video.

Chart performance

References

1982 singles
1982 songs
The Statler Brothers songs
Songs written by Don Reid (singer)
Songs written by Harold Reid
Song recordings produced by Jerry Kennedy
Mercury Records singles